Ralph Conant Hamner (September 12, 1916 – May 22, 2001) nicknamed "Bruz", was a professional baseball player.  He was a right-handed pitcher over parts of four seasons (1946–49) with the Chicago White Sox and Chicago Cubs.  For his career, he compiled an 8–20 record, with a 4.58 earned run average, and 99 strikeouts in 220 innings pitched.

He was born in Gibsland, Louisiana and later died in Little Rock, Arkansas at the age of 84.

External links

1916 births
2001 deaths
Chicago White Sox players
Chicago Cubs players
Major League Baseball pitchers
Baseball players from Louisiana
Akron Yankees players
Fort Worth Cats players
Norfolk Tars players
Binghamton Triplets players
Anniston Rams players
Shreveport Sports players
Los Angeles Angels (minor league) players
People from Gibsland, Louisiana